Alfa Romeo Giulia is the name of three not directly related models by the Italian car manufacturer Alfa Romeo. The first is a line of sporty four-door compact executive cars (Type 105) produced from 1962 to 1978, the second is an updated, mainly up-engined Spider, Sprint and Sprint Speciale Giuliettas, and the third Giulia is a compact executive car (type 952) unveiled in 2015.

Alfa Romeo was one of the first mainstream manufacturers to put a powerful engine in a light-weight  four-door car for mass production. The Type 105 Giulia was equipped with a light alloy twin overhead camshaft four-cylinder engine similar to that of the earlier Giulietta (750/101) range, available in 1.3-litre (1,290 cc) and 1.6-litre (1,570 cc) versions.  Various configurations of carburetors and tuning produced power outputs from about 80 to about 110 bhp (55 to 75 kW), coupled in most cases to 5-speed manual transmission.

Giulia sedans were noted for lively handling and impressive acceleration among small European four-door sedans of their era, especially considering modest engine sizes offered.  The popular Super version with the twin carburettor 1.6 litre engine had a top speed of 170 km/h (106 mph) and accelerated from  0 to 100 km/h (62 mph) in about 12 seconds, better than many sports cars of the late 1960s and early 1970s. When leaving the factory all variations of the Giulia originally fitted either Pirelli Cinturato 165HR14 or 155HR15 tyres (CA67).

The styling of the boxy four-door notchback saloon was somewhat wanting. The engine bay, cabin and boot were all square shaped, buffered somewhat by details on the grill, roofline, bonnet and boot.

The Giulia Spider was succeeded by the Alfa Romeo Spider (105/115) in 1966.

Models

Note: chassis and engine type numbers displayed in italic for each model are sourced from Fusi 1978, pages 841–848.

Giulia TI
 Tipo: 105.14 (LHD, column shifter), 105.08 (LHD, floor shifter), 105.09 (RHD, floor shifter). Engine: 00514.
Unveiled on 27 June 1962 at the Autodromo Nazionale Monza, the Alfa Romeo Giulia TI was the very first of the Giulia family of cars to be introduced. The "TI" nomenclature referred to a class of Italian saloon car racing known as "Turismo Internazionale", and had previously been applied to higher-performance versions of the 1900 and Giulietta saloons in the 1950s. However, for the Giulia saloon, the TI was at first the only version available, and later, with the introduction of the TI Super and Super, the TI became the base version in the 1.6-litre engine class. A distinguishing feature of the original Giulia were drum brakes on all corners, the front ones of the three-shoe type like on late Giuliettas; four-wheel Dunlop disc brakes and a brake servo were phased in during August 1963, after 22–23 thousand cars had been built. The car was marketed as a six-seater, thanks to a standard column-mounted shifter and a split bench front seat—though Italian car magazine Quattroruote found it rather a comfortable four-seater. Other notable interior features of the early models were mottled cloth and vinyl upholstery, a grey, trapezoid instrument panel including a strip speedometer, and a black steering wheel with two ivory-coloured spokes and a chrome half horn ring.

In May 1964 a floor shifter became available (chassis tipo 105.08), to be ordered solely in conjunction with the newly introduced separate front seats. Around the same time a right hand drive model variant entered production (tipo 105.09), with floor shifter only.
In February 1966 several changes were made. The floor shifter became standard; the interior received new seats, a new dashboard with triple round instruments (two large ones and the smaller fuel gauge in the centre) in place of the strip speedometer, and new door cards. From outside these later TIs can be recognized by L-shaped chrome strips around the tail lights which supplanted the previous C-shaped ones.
Production of the Giulia TI ceased during 1967; it was replaced by the Giulia 1600 S as the entry-level 1.6-litre model.

Giulia TI Super
Tipo: 105.16. Engine: 00516.

The Alfa Romeo Giulia TI Super was a special road-going sports model produced in limited numbers, fitted with a more powerful engine and a number of weight saving components, and intended for racing use. It was introduced to the press at the Monza race track on 24 April 1963.
In total only 501 were made, 178 in 1963 and 323 1964.
On 2 May 1964 the TI Super received international FIA and Italian CSAI homologation for racing, and was then extensively campaigned in the European Touring Car Challenge.
Today the Giulia TI Super is rare and considered very desirable by collectors.

The TI Super's 1,570 cc engine was the same installed on the Giulia Sprint Speciale coupé—though bearing a different type code.
Parts contributing to the weight reduction were mesh grilles replacing the inner pair of head lamps, bumpers without overriders, fixed front quarter windows, Plexiglas rear windows, and magnesium alloy wheels with hubcaps, very similar in appearance to the standard steel wheels of the TI. Braking was by discs all around, although the first cars used drums. Cars built from August 1964 used the bodyshell of the TI with mounting points for the brake servo, but were never fitted with one.
On the inside both the gear shifter and the handbrake lever were moved to the floor. The TI's instrument cluster with its strip speedometer was replaced by a three-instrument binnacle comprising speedometer, tachometer and a multi-gauge instrument (fuel level, water temperature, oil temperature and oil pressure). The steering wheel was a three-spoke aluminium lightweight item with centre horn button. Front racing-type bucket seats and safety belts were standard, while the heater, door armrests, the grab handle in front of the passenger, the glove box lid, and ashtrays were deleted.
Visually the Giulia TI Super was made immediately recognizable by green quadrifoglios (four-leaf clovers) on the front wings and tail panel, and "Giulia TI Super" scripts on the engine bonnet and tail. All cars produced were painted white, save for two examples—one red and one grey.

Contrary to popular belief, the Giulias used by the Italian police forces (the Pantere of the Polizia di Stato and Gazzelle of the Carabinieri) were not tuned TI Supers but rather standard models; early ones were fitted with mesh in place of the inner headlights like the TI Super simply to make the siren mounted behind sound louder. Only two TI Supers were actually owned by the Polizia, and used at the police schools of Nettuno and Cesena.

Giulia 1300
Tipo: 105.06. Engine: 00506.
The Giulia 1300 marked the Giulia's entry in the then crowded 1.3-litre class, and featured simplified trim and equipment. It was introduced on 11 May 1964 at the Autodromo Nazionale Monza and produced until 1971, in left hand drive only.
At first the Giulia 1300 was sold alongside the slightly cheaper Giulietta TI, the last of the outgoing 101-series Giulietta saloons, in its last year of production.
In fact the Giulia used a twin cam engine derived from the Giulietta TI's. A four-speed gearbox with floor change fitted as standard; the 1300 would remain the only Giulia model not fitted with a five-speed gearbox. Braking was by discs all around, without a servo at first, later with a servo.

Visually the 1300 was distinguished by a new grille design housing single instead of twin head lamps, rectangular side repeaters without ornamentation, and all-metal hubcaps. It also did without bumper over-riders, most pieces of exterior chrome trim, and rear back-up lamps. Inside dashboard and steering wheel came from the TI (though the latter was all-black), there were rubber mats instead of carpets, and several convenience features such as the passenger grab handle and rear ashtrays were omitted.
In September 1967 the Giulia 1300 was updated, adopting a black mesh grille with three horizontal chrome bars, the vertical louvres at the base of the windshield first seen on the Giulia Super, the second series Giulia TI three round instrument dashboard, and the 1300 ti's three-spoke steering wheel.

Giulia Super
Tipo 105.26 was introduced at the 1965 Geneva Motor Show. It transferred the technology from the racing TI Super to a road car, to make the most successful Giulia saloon. 1,570 cc engine with two double-choke Weber 40DCOE carburettors for a milder, but torquier tune than the TI Super -  at 5500 rpm. New dashboard with two large round instruments (speedo and tacho) and clock.  Sportier steering wheel with three aluminium spokes and centre horn push, similar to that of the Ti Super, later changed for one with the horn pushes in the spokes. All-around disc brakes with servo were fitted as standard from the outset. The serpent crest of the Sforza family appears in a badge on the C-pillar and is a distinguishing feature of the Super saloon.  For 1968, there was a suspension update, including revised geometry and a rear anti-roll bar.  The wheels were changed in size from 5J x 15 to 5J x 14, and tires from 155/15 Pirelli Cinturato to 165/14 Pirelli Cinturato. For 1970, updates included dual-circuit brakes, centre-mounted handbrake lever to replace under-dash "umbrella handle", larger external door handles, and top-hinged pedals (the latter in left hand drive models only; right hand drive continued with bottom-hinged pedals to the end of production). In 1972, Tipo 105.26 was rationalised into the Giulia 1.3 - Giulia 1.6 range (see below).

Giulia 1300 ti
Tipo 105.39 was built from 1965 to 1972. Right hand drive model replaced in 1970 by the 1300 Super (see below). Unlike the re-deployed 101-series Giulietta engine of the austerity-model 1300, the 1300 ti motor was a 105 series engine, basically that of the sportier GT1300 Junior coupe with different camshaft timing (but the same camshafts) and induction system. Other features were the five-speed gearbox, a three-spoke bakelite steering wheel with plastic horn push covering the centre and spokes, and the dashboard initially with strip speedo like that of the TI. For 1968, updates included a dashboard based on that of the Super, but with a simpler instrument binnacle, still featuring two large round instruments (speedo and tacho) and a separate fuel gauge, and the same suspension, wheel and tire updates applied to the Giulia Super in the same year.  1970 updates included dual-circuit brakes, centre handbrake, larger external doorhandles and top-hinged pedals (on left hand drive cars only), again as applied to the Super for that year.

Giulia 1600 S
Tipo 105.85 was basically a Giulia TI re-introduced in 1968 as a lower-level model to come between the 1300 and 1300 ti on one hand, and the Super on the other. Replaced in 1970 by the 1300 Super (see below) which offered similar performance in a lower tax bracket. The last cars from 1970 featured the top-hinged pedals, centre handbrake and dual-circuit brakes as for the Super and 1300 ti.

Giulia 1300 Super
Tipo 115.09 was introduced in 1970. It was basically a 1300 ti fitted with the engine from the GT 1300 Junior coupe that featured two double-choke horizontal carburettors; the engine actually had the GT 1300 Junior type number. This model was rationalised into the Giulia Super 1.3 - Giulia Super 1.6 range in 1972.

Giulia Super 1.3 and Giulia Super 1.6
In 1972 a rationalisation of the Giulia range saw the Super 1300 (Tipo 115.09) and the Super (Tipo 105.26) re-released as the Super 1.3 and Super 1.6. The two models featured the same equipment, interior and exterior trim, differing only in engine size (1,290 cc and 1,570 cc) and final drive ratio. The 1300 ti was dropped. A small Alfa Romeo badge on the C-pillar is a distinguishing feature, as are hubcaps with exposed wheel nuts.

1600 Rallye
In December 1972 Alfa-Romeo South Africa released the 1600 Rallye. This locally developed more powerful 1600 cc version of the 1300 Super, using the 1300s single-headlight body shell. The car was largely ready for competition and was only planned to be built in limited numbers, and was fitted with racing-style rear-view mirrors, rally lamps, fully adjustable seats, and a limited-slip differential. Claimed power was  SAE.

Giulia Nuova Super

The Giulia Super range was re-released in 1974 as the Nuova Super range, including the Giulia Nuova Super 1300 and 1600  This and featured a new black plastic front grille and a flat boot (trunk) lid without the characteristic centre spine. Otherwise the cars differed little from their Giulia Super predecessors and bore the same Tipo numbers with an S suffix. Production ceased in 1977.

Giulia Nuova Super Diesel
Tipo: 115.40. Engine: 108U.
Introduced in June 1976, the Giulia Nuova Super Diesel became the first ever diesel engined Alfa Romeo passenger car. It was fitted with a naturally aspirated Perkins type 4.108 1,760 cc four cylinder, the same engine used on the Alfa Romeo F12 van. In total 6,537 examples made up to 1977. The diesels were not quite in line with Alfa Romeo's sporting image, but Alfa's president stated that Italy's fiscal legislation so favoured diesels that the company was simply forced to offer such an option.

Engines and performance

Unless noted otherwise, DIN rated horsepower and torque is given.

Notes
 * SAE rated

Giulia Spider, Sprint and Sprint Speciale

The Spider, Sprint and Sprint Speciale Giulias introduced together with the Giulia sedan in 1962 were rebadged and updated versions of earlier Giulietta models (series 101), now with a  1.6 litre instead of a 1.3 litre engine. Easiest to distinguish from a Giulietta is the Spider (tipo 101.23), which featured a bonnet bulge to clear the slightly taller engine. The Giulia Sprint 1600 (tipo 101.12) arrived in June 1962. The Sprint coupé was also available for a short time with the 1.3 litre engine as the Sprint 1300 - essentially a Giulietta Sprint with a different name. This version carries a small "1300" script on the lower bootlid, while Giulia 1600 Sprints have a "1600" badge just behind the rear wheel. Most models were discontinued in 1964, although the Sprint Speciale continued until 1966. The Spider was complemented by a Spider Veloce in 1964 (tipo 101.18), using the engine seen in the Giulia Sprint Speciale and Giulia TI Super, producing . The Giulia Spider continued to be available until the mid-1966 introduction of the Spider 1600 Duetto.

Giulia Sprint GT

In 1963 the Alfa Romeo Giulia Sprint GT (tipo 105) was first shown. This coupé (and rare convertible sister, the Giulia GTC) proceeded to be developed through numerous series with engines from 1.3 up to 2 liters. Production ended in 1976. There was also a range of competition models called the GTA as well as a Zagato-bodied iteration called the Junior Z.

2015 Alfa Romeo Giulia (952)

The Giulia (952) compact executive car was unveiled on 24 June 2015 at the Museo Storico Alfa Romeo in Arese. The all-new model is the first product of the company's revival plan, which will see the brand return to a rear wheel drive platform with the option of all wheel drive. The new model was shown in the high-performance "Quadrifoglio" specification.

Following the success of the Giulia, Alfa Romeo unveiled the Stelvio - Alfa Romeo's first ever SUV - at the 2016 Los Angeles Auto Show. Production started at the Cassino Plant end of 2016, attaining top-Alfa sales by 2018.

The Giulia Quadrifoglio has been highly praised by the motoring press when compared against its nearest rivals, including the highly specified later generations of BMW M3, it has gone on to be voted "Best Super Saloon" 4 years running deposing BMW of the prime position between 2016 and 2020 (UK - Autocar Magazine)

The Giulia Quadrifoglio uses a 2.9 Litre 90 degree Twin Turbo V6 producing 503bhp, and an 8 speed ZF Auto box / or 6sp Manual. This gives the car a maximum quoted speed of 191mph and 0-60mph in 3.8 seconds. 

The engine is rumoured to have derived from the Ferrari California with 2 cylinders removed, the car as a whole was very much designed by several Ferrari engineers and the aerodynamics were honed in the Ferrari Wind tunnel.

The Giulia Quadrifoglio is not currently offered with 4wd, but 4wd is available on other models in the range.

See also
Alfa Romeo Sprint GT (Veloce)
Alfa Romeo Spider
Alfa Romeo Giulia TZ
Alfa Romeo Giulia Sprint Speciale
Alfa Romeo GTA
Alfa Romeo Montreal

Notes

References

External links

 Motorbase: Alfa Romeo Giulia Ti/Super  (1962–1972)
 Motorbase: Alfa Romeo Giulia Sprint GT/Sprint GT Veloce/GTC (1963–1968)
 Motorbase: Alfa Romeo Giulia 1300/1300TI/1300 Super  (1964–1972)
   All models and series, provided with images and descriptions
 
allcarsmanuals.com: Workshop manuals and technical information

Giulia
Rear-wheel-drive vehicles
Cars introduced in 1962
Police vehicles
Mid-size cars
Compact executive cars
Sports sedans
Coupés
Roadsters
1970s cars